Marion Township is one of twelve townships in Hendricks County, Indiana, United States. As of the 2010 census, its population was 1,402.

Geography

Unincorporated towns
 Hadley
 New Winchester
(This list is based on USGS data and may include former settlements.)

Adjacent townships
 Eel River Township (north)
 Center Township (east)
 Clay Township (south)
 Floyd Township, Putnam County (west)
 Jackson Township, Putnam County (northwest)

Cemeteries
The township contains fifteen cemeteries: Abner-Ragan, Dickerson, Higgins, New Winchester Baptist, New Winchester, Noland Number 1, Peck, Robbins, Ryner, Sears, Shannon, Tinder, Turner, Turner Farm and Vannice.

Major highways
  U.S. Route 36
  Indiana State Road 75
  Indiana State Road 236

Airports and Landing strips
 Layne Field 5II1

References
 U.S. Board on Geographic Names (GNIS)
 United States Census Bureau cartographic boundary files

External links

Townships in Hendricks County, Indiana
Townships in Indiana